Variations on a Theme is the debut studio album by American heavy metal band Om. It was the first recording in several years to feature former Sleep bassist/vocalist Al Cisneros. The vinyl version of the album was released on April 18, 2005. It was pressed on black, clear and clear purple vinyl.

Background 
When Om was formed in 2003, they began recording practice tapes. At the time, bassist-vocalist Al Cisneros' girlfriend got them in contact with John Whitston, founder of Holy Mountain Records, who quickly signed them and gave them time to record. Around the same time, the band performed its first shows at the Bottom of the Hill and The Independent in San Francisco.

Track listing

Personnel 
 Al Cisneros – vocals, bass
 Chris Hakius – drums, percussion
 Produced by Om and Billy Anderson

References 

2005 debut albums
Om (band) albums
Albums produced by Billy Anderson (producer)